Raymond Christopher Middleton (9 August 1936 – 8 January 2023) was a British racewalker. He represented Great Britain at the 1964 Summer Olympics in the 50 kilometres race walk. He was also a six-time participant at the IAAF World Race Walking Cup between 1961 and 1973. He took silver medals at the 1963 IAAF World Race Walking Cup (behind István Havasi) and 1966 British Empire and Commonwealth Games (behind Ron Wallwork).

Born in Marylebone, he joined Belgrave Harriers athletics club and began competing internationally for Great Britain in his twenties. He competed at the European Athletics Championships on three occasions (1962, 1966, 1969) with his best placing at that competition being fifth (achieved in both 1966 and 1969).

Nationally, he had much success at the Race Walking Association championships. He won the 50 km title in 1963 as well as being runner-up in 1965, 1964, 1966, 1967 and 1970. He placed in the top three on five occasions over the 20-mile championship distance. He also was third in the 7-mile race at the AAA Championships in 1962.

Middleton died of respiratory failure following an infection, on 8 January 2023, at the age of 86.

International competitions

References

1936 births
2023 deaths
People from Marylebone
Sportspeople from London
British male racewalkers
English male racewalkers
Olympic athletes of Great Britain
Athletes (track and field) at the 1964 Summer Olympics
Commonwealth Games medallists in athletics
Athletes (track and field) at the 1966 British Empire and Commonwealth Games
Commonwealth Games silver medallists for England
Medallists at the 1966 British Empire and Commonwealth Games